The VII Corps of the Ottoman Empire (Turkish: 7 nci Kolordu or Yedinci Kolordu) was one of the corps of the Ottoman Army. It was formed in the early 20th century during Ottoman military reforms.

Formation

Order of Battle, 1911 
With further reorganizations of the Ottoman Army, to include the creation of corps level headquarters, by 1911 the VII Corps was headquartered in Üsküp. The Corps before the First Balkan War in 1911 was structured as such:

VII Corps, Üsküp
19th Infantry Division, Üsküp
55th Infantry Regiment, Kumanova
56th Infantry Regiment, Kumanova
57th Infantry Regiment, Bilaç ve Berana
19th Rifle Battalion, Üsküp
19th Field Artillery Regiment, Üsküp
19th Division Band, Üsküp
20th Infantry Division, Metroviça
58th Infantry Regiment, Metroviça
59th Infantry Regiment, Taşlıca
60th Infantry Regiment, Taşlıca
20th Rifle Battalion, Yakova
20th Field Artillery Regiment, Priştine
20th Division Band, Metroviça
21st Infantry Division, Yakova
61st Infantry Regiment, Yakova
62nd Infantry Regiment, İpek
63rd Infantry Regiment, Berana
21st Rifle Battalion, Yakova
21st Field Artillery Regiment, Pirzerin
21st Division Band, Yakova
Units of VII Corps
7th Rifle Regiment, Monastir
7th Cavalry Brigade, Monastir
6th Cavalry Regiment, Monastir
16th Cavalry Regiment, İştip
13th Horse Artillery Regiment, Pirlepe
3rd Horse Artillery Battalion, Monastir
2nd Mountain Artillery Battalion, Monastir
8th Mountain Artillery Battalion, Monastir
9th Mountain Artillery Battalion, Elbasan
5th Field Howitzer Battalion, Monastir
6th Engineer Battalion, Köprülü
6th Telegraph Battalion, Monastir
6th Transport Battalion, Monastir
Border companies x 9

Balkan Wars

Order of Battle, October 19, 1912 
On October 19, 1912, the corps was structured as follows:

VII Corps (Serbian Front, under the command of the Vardar Army of the Western Army)
19th Division
Üsküp Redif Division, Priştine Redif Division

World War I

Order of Battle 
During World War I, the corps was structured as follows:

VII Corps
39th Division (Taiz Operational Region, commanded by Miralay Ali Sait Bey)
40th Division (Tehame Operational Region, commanded by Miralay Hüseyin Ragıp Bey, since March 9, 1917, Kaymakam Galip Bey)

After Mudros

Order of Battle, November 1918 
In November 1918, the corps was structured as follows:

VII Corps
39th Division (commanded by Mirliva Ali Sait Pasha)
40th Division (commanded by Kaymakam Galip Bey)

Sources

Corps of the Ottoman Empire
Military units and formations of the Ottoman Empire in the Balkan Wars
Military units and formations of the Ottoman Empire in World War I
History of Skopje
History of Kosovo
Ottoman period in Yemen
Macedonia under the Ottoman Empire